Zineddine Mohamed Seghir (born 22 August 1959) is an Algerian handball player. He competed at the 1984 Summer Olympics and the 1988 Summer Olympics.

References

External links
 

1959 births
Living people
Algerian male handball players
Olympic handball players of Algeria
Handball players at the 1984 Summer Olympics
Handball players at the 1988 Summer Olympics
Place of birth missing (living people)
21st-century Algerian people